The 1999 Daytona 500, the 41st running of the event, was held February 14, 1999, at Daytona International Speedway. Jeff Gordon won the pole and won the race, making him the first Daytona 500 pole sitter to win the race since Bill Elliott in 1987. Including the No Bull 5 Bonus, Gordon earned a then-record payout of $2,172,246 for winning, while the last place finisher earned $91,751.

Silly season
The start of the 1999 season was marked by three owners (Andy Petree, Travis Carter, and Joe Gibbs) expanding to 2 full-time teams for the first time in their careers. Their drivers were Kenny Wallace (Petree), Darrell Waltrip (Carter), and rookie Tony Stewart (JGR). Several new teams debuted, including Joe Bessey's new #60 and the #58 Ford owned by Scott Barbour. Speedweeks would also be marked by controversy involving Junie Donlavey's #90 Ford.  Rookie driver Mike Harmon was dismissed from his team just before the Gatorade 125 qualifying races after reports surfaced that Harmon's sponsor, Big Daddy's Barbecue Sauce, was not living up to its contract obligations, as well as the team wanting a veteran driver to find more speed on the track; Donlavey's team wound up signing Mike Wallace, who'd driven for the team in the 1994-96 period.

Qualifying and Gatorade 125s

Jeff Gordon won the pole for the race with a speed of just over 195 mph, and would start alongside former Indy Racing League champion Tony Stewart, who was making his Winston Cup debut. A total of 59 drivers would make an attempt to qualify for the 1999 Daytona 500. Bobby Labonte would win the first Gatorade 125 qualifying race after taking the lead from Gordon on lap 39. A lap 1 incident, the only caution of the First Duel, ended Dan Pardus and Jeff Green's chances at making the Daytona 500. Dale Earnhardt won the 2nd Gatorade duel after taking the lead from Stewart on lap 8. The second duel was marred by two caution periods that ended Dick Trickle, Glen Morgan, and David Green's chances at qualifying for the race. This would be Earnhardt's final win at Daytona.

Drivers qualified for the Daytona 500 either by finishing in the top 16 in their qualifying race, through a 2-lap qualifying run, or a provisional starting spot based on owner points from the 1999 season. They had three chances to make a 2-lap time trial run that would be fast enough to make the Daytona 500.

Race summary
This race was known for Jeff Gordon's daring three-wide pass on Rusty Wallace and Mike Skinner. He passed Wallace after ducking to the apron, nearly plowing into the damaged car of Ricky Rudd. Skinner jumped to the outside and they raced three-wide for three laps until Dale Earnhardt  (the defending Daytona 500 winner) gave Gordon the needed push. The race was also known for a determined Earnhardt repeatedly trying to pass Gordon for the lead on the final lap, only for Gordon to beat him to the finish. The race had a 13-car pileup on lap 135, in which eventual series champion Dale Jarrett flipped over twice but however, he was uninjured. This was also the first Winston No Bull 5 race of the season.

Results

References

Daytona 500
Daytona 500
NASCAR races at Daytona International Speedway